Nomis brunnealis is a moth in the family Crambidae. It was described by Eugene G. Munroe and Akira Mutuura in 1968. It is found in Honshu, Japan.

References

Moths described in 1968
Pyraustinae